The Equatorial antpitta (Grallaria saturata) is a species of bird in the family, Grallariidae. It is a member of the rufous antpitta species complex and in 2020, was found to be a species and not just a subspecies. It is found is southern Colombia, Ecuador, and northern Peru.

Taxonomy
The Equatorial antpitta was described as a subspecies of rufous antpitta in 1918, but was later considered to be conspecific with the rufous antpitta. However, in 2020 a study resurrected the synonymized subspecies and promoted it to species rank using genetic evidence and analysis of vocalizations.

The Equatorial antpitta is named for its distribution around the Equator.

Distribution and habitat
The Equatorial antpitta is found in two disjunct regions of northwestern South America separated by Colombian massif. The northern population is found in the central Colombian Andes east of the Cauca river, and further east to Iguaque Massif. The southern population is found in the central Andes from Colombia, through Ecuador and into the Peruvian departments of Cajamarca and Piura. It inhabits humid montane forests and forest edges and prefers the understory or forest floor. It is found in several protected areas including Podocarpus National Park and Tabaconas Nambelle National Sanctuary, both in Ecuador.

The Equatorial antpitta is separated from the closely related Cajamarca antpitta by the Huancabamba and Marañón rivers, and from the Chamí antpitta by the Cauca River Valley. The population in the Iguaque Massif Andes spur are separated from the Muisca antpitta by the Magdalena River Valley.

The Equatorial antpitta is the most widely distributed of the 12 members of the rufous antpitta complex.

References

Grallaria
Birds of Peru
Birds of Ecuador
Birds of Colombia